The Österreichische Militärische Zeitschrift (Austrian Military Journal) is a bimonthly academic journal for defence matters, covering reports and analyses in the fields of security policy and military science. The journal was established in 1808 by Archduke Charles, Duke of Teschen. Moritz Gomez de Parientos (1744–1810) was the first editor-in-chief. The content is written in German. Some abstracts are available in French and English.

Further reading 
 Zitterhofer, Karl: Streffleurs Militärische Zeitschrift 1808-1908. Eine Geschichte dieser Zeitschrift anläßlich ihres 100jährigen Bestehens mit einem Generalregister der Militärischen Zeitschrift 1808-1907 und des Organs 1870-1906, Vienna 1908 (supplement 1908–1912, Vienna 1913).
 Pleiner, Horst: Die Österreichische Militärische Zeitschrift - Ein historischer Rückblick von den Anfängen bis zur Gegenwart", in: Österreichische Militärische Zeitschrift - Festschrift anlässlich des 200-jährigen Jubiläums der Österreichischen Militärischen Zeitschrift, extra issue Vienna 2008.

References

External links 
 

Military journals
German-language journals
Bimonthly journals
Publications established in 1808
1808 establishments in Austria